Surumi can refer to:

 a misspelling of surimi, a paste made from fish or other meat
The word "Surumi" is also a village name in Nagaland India. The village is second largest and having highest population among the sumi village.
 Surumi Peninsula, in Gasmata, Papua New Guinea